Liz Larsen (born January 16, 1959 in Philadelphia, Pennsylvania) is an American actress. She is best known for playing Jessica Reed on Law & Order. Larsen received a Tony Award nomination for The Most Happy Fella revival (1992) and has also appeared on Broadway in Hairspray, The Rocky Horror Show, Damn Yankees, Starmites, and Fiddler on the Roof. She has performed in Beautiful: The Carole King Musical since its opening in 2014.

Larsen attended New Hope Solebury High School in New Hope, Bucks County PA.

External links

Internet Broadway Database:  http://ibdb.com/person.php?id=72500

Living people
Actresses from Philadelphia
American television actresses
American musical theatre actresses
1959 births
20th-century American actresses
21st-century American actresses
George School alumni